Frank Eugene Lutz (September 15, 1879 – November 27, 1943) was an American entomologist.

Biography
He graduated from Haverford College, Pennsylvania, in 1900 (A.B.), then from the University of Chicago in 1902 (A.M.), and then entered University College, London, England, where he was a student of Karl Pearson. He was resident investigator at the Carnegie Institution's new Station for Experimental Evolution at Cold Spring Harbor, Long Island, New York from 1904 to 1909 where he did genetic studies of Drosophila. He received a Ph.D. from the University of Chicago in 1907.  His thesis was on cricket variation. In 1909, he became assistant curator of invertebrate zoology at American Museum of Natural History, New York City, becoming associate curator in 1916. He was known for his interest in the genetics of Drosophila.

Dr Frank Lutz pioneered the first nature trail in the United States. An idea that spread quickly to parks across the country and the world. See Educational trail. He married Martha Ellen Brobson of Philadelphia in 1904.  They had four children.

Writing
He made numerous contributions to the scientific journals on the subjects variation, heredity, assortive mating and entomology. He wrote Field Book of Insects published in 1917 illustrated in the main by Edna Libby Beutenmüller. He also wrote A Lot of Insects published in 1941.

References

1879 births
1943 deaths
People from Bloomsburg, Pennsylvania
American entomologists
People associated with the American Museum of Natural History
American curators
University of Chicago alumni
People from Cold Spring Harbor, New York
Haverford College alumni
Scientists from New York (state)